Luis Enrique Medrano Toj (born ) is a Guatemalan male weightlifter, competing in the 56 kg category and representing Guatemala at international competitions. He participated at the 1996 Summer Olympics in the 54 kg event and at the 2000 Summer Olympics in the 56 kg event. He competed at world championships, most recently at the 1999 World Weightlifting Championships.

Major results

References

External links
 

1976 births
Living people
Guatemalan male weightlifters
Weightlifters at the 2000 Summer Olympics
Olympic weightlifters of Guatemala
Place of birth missing (living people)
Weightlifters at the 1999 Pan American Games
Weightlifters at the 2003 Pan American Games
Weightlifters at the 1996 Summer Olympics
Pan American Games competitors for Guatemala
20th-century Guatemalan people
21st-century Guatemalan people